Losine is a village and comune in the province of Brescia, in Lombardy. Neighbouring communes are Braone, Breno, Cerveno, Malegno and Niardo.

References

External links

Cities and towns in Lombardy